Robert Au-yeung Tsan-wah (born 28 July 1960) is a Hong Kong actor best known for his comedic roles in many TVB television dramas. He gained wide public attention in the 1990s for his portrayal of Ben Yu in the 1991 legal drama File of Justice, appearing in all five seasons. Au-yeung is also known for his lead roles in several of TVB's most successful television series franchises, including Armed Reaction, Witness to a Prosecution, and Forensic Heroes. He is most recognised by TV audiences for his shaved head.

Au-yeung graduated from TVB's Artiste Training Academy in 1982 and began appearing in many television dramas as background extras, to roles with minor speaking parts, and later to major supporting roles. He landed his first lead role in the legal drama File of Justice, which premiered in 1992. File of Justice was a major success and spawned five seasons, turning Au-yeung into a major breakout star. Au-yeung won Best Actor at the 2000 TVB Anniversary Awards for his portrayal as Sung Chee in Witness to a Prosecution. In 2007, he became the first Hong Kong actor to receive a nomination for Best Actor at the International Emmy Awards for his performance in Dicey Business.

Filmography

Films

Television dramas

Awards and titles
TVB Anniversary Awards 1997 Most Comedic On-Screen Duo ~ Taming of the Princess (with Esther Kwan)
TVB Anniversary Awards 2000 My Favourite Actor in a Leading Role ~ Witness to a Prosecution
TVB Anniversary Awards 2000 My Top 10 Favorite Television Characters ~ Witness to a Prosecution
TVB Anniversary Awards 2001 My Top 13 Favorite Television Characters ~ Armed Reaction III
TVB Anniversary Awards 2003 My Top 12 Favorite Television Characters ~ A Witness to a Prosecution II
TVB Anniversary Awards 2004 My Top 12 Favorite Television Characters ~ Shine on You
35th International Emmy Award 2007 Nominee for Best Performance by an Actor ~ Dicey Business
22nd Asia Television Awards 2017 Best Comedy Performance by An Actor/Actress ~ House of Spirits

References

External links
 JayneStars.com - English translated news about Bobby Au-Yeung
 

|-
!colspan="3" style="background: #DAA520;" | TVB Anniversary Awards

1960 births
TVB veteran actors
Living people
Hong Kong male television actors
Hong Kong male film actors
20th-century Hong Kong male actors
21st-century Hong Kong male actors